The third round of the 2000–01 UEFA Cup began on 21 November 2000. The round included 24 winners from the second round as well as 8 third placed teams from the Champions League First group stage.

Seeding

Matches

|}

First leg

Second leg

Internazionale win 2–1 on aggregate.

Parma win 4–2 on aggregate.

Stuttgart win 4–3 on aggregate.

Rayo Vallecano win 2–0 on aggregate.

PSV Eindhoven win 4–0 on aggregate.

Roma win 4–0 on aggregate.

Nantes win 7–4 on aggregate.

Bordeaux win 4–1 on aggregate.

Liverpool win 4–2 on aggregate.

AEK Athens win 6–4 on aggregate.

Celta Vigo win 1–0 on aggregate.

Alavés win 4–2 on aggregate.

Porto win 2–0 on aggregate.

Slavia Prague win 5–3 on aggregate.

Barcelona win 3–1 on aggregate.

Kaiserslautern win 3–1 on aggregate.

External links
Third Round Information
RSSSF Page
Worldfootball.net Page

2000–01 UEFA Cup